"Cómo Me Duele Perderte" (How It Hurts to Lose You) is a song by Gloria Estefan, released as her second single from her third Spanish album Alma Caribeña.

History 
This single was released as a commercial single worldwide at different dates. This song is a slow ballad with tropical rhythms, and it has been labeled as a bachata in which the protagonist is lamenting how her love is going away.

This song was another number one on the United States Hot Latin Tracks.

The song became part of a soap opera called Lazos de Familia in Spain.

Formats and track listings

Official versions and remixes
Original versions
 Album version (4:28)
 Tropical version (4:32)

Remixes
 Pablo Flores Club Mix – Radio Edit (4:43)
 Pablo Flores Club Mix (9:47)
 Pablo Flores Dub Mix (8:15)
 Davidson Ospina's Radio Edit (3:49)
 Davidson Ospina's Radio Edit Instrumental (3:45)
 Davidson Ospina's "Duele" Club Mix (7:09)
 Davidson Ospina's "Duele" Dub Mix (5:18)
 Plasmic Honey's Sweet Spanish Spice Mix (9:18)
 Chris "The Greek" Panaghi's Dark Club Mix (8:15)
 Chris "The Greek" Panaghi's Trance Mix (7:07)
 Chris "The Greek" Panaghi's Dark Drumz (4:16)

Charts

Release history

References

External links
Lyrics with English translation
Gloria Estefan discography database

Spanish-language songs
2000 singles
Gloria Estefan songs
Epic Records singles
2000 songs
Song recordings produced by George Noriega
Songs written by Marco Flores (songwriter)